The four scattered and poorly attested Alumic languages form a branch of the Plateau languages of central Nigeria.

Classification
The following classification is taken from Blench (2008). The languages are not closely related and are morphologically quite diverse due to different contact situations; given the poor state of their description, their relationship is provisional.

Ethnologue scatters these languages throughout Plateau: Hasha and Sambe with Eggon (Southern branch), and Alumu–Tesu and Toro as two independent branches.

Blench (2019) also includes Nigbo (extinct).

Names and locations
Below is a list of language names, populations, and locations from Blench (2019).

References 

Blench (2008) Prospecting proto-Plateau. Manuscript.

External links
Roger Blench, Alumic languages (wordlists)

 
Plateau languages